Channomuraena is a genus of moray eels in the family Muraenidae.

Species
 Channomuraena bauchotae Saldanha & Quéro, 1994
 Channomuraena vittata (J. Richardson, 1845) (Broadbanded moray)

References

 

Muraenidae